Isidore Isaac Hirschman Jr. (1922–1990) was an American mathematician, and professor at Washington University in St. Louis working on analysis.

Life 
Hirschman earned his Ph.D. in 1947 from Harvard under David Widder. After writing ten papers together, Hirschman and Widder published a book entitled The Convolution Transform. Hirschman spent most of his career (1949–1978) at Washington University, where he published mainly in harmonic analysis and operator theory. Washington University holds a lecture series given by Hirschman, with one lecture given by Richard Askey. While Askey was at Washington University, Hirschman asked him to solve an ultraspherical polynomial problem. Askey says in this lecture, "This led to a joint paper, and was what started my interest in special functions."

Research 
Hirschman's Ph.D. was entitled “Some Representation and Inversion Problems for the Laplace Transform,” He mainly published papers in harmonic analysis and operator theory. In 1959 Hirschman wrote a paper with Askey,  Weighted quadratic norms and ultraspherical polynomials, which was published in the Transactions of the American Mathematical Society. This was one of the two articles Hirschman and Askey co-wrote to complete Hirschman's 1955 research program.

Selected publications

Articles
 
 
 
 
 
 
 
 
 
 
 
 
 
 
 
 }

Books
 Hirschman, I. (1962). Infinite Series. New York: Holt, Rinehart & Winston. – A textbook for advanced undergraduate and graduate mathematics.
Hirschman, Isidore Isaac; Widder, David Vernon (1955). The Convolution Transform. New York: Princeton University Press; now available from Dover Publications.

References

http://mathdl.maa.org/mathDL/46/?pa=content&sa=viewDocument&nodeId=3801&bodyId=4189

20th-century American mathematicians
Harvard University alumni
Washington University in St. Louis faculty
Washington University in St. Louis mathematicians
1922 births
1990 deaths